A Year Without Love is a 2005 Argentine drama film directed by Anahí Berneri, and written by Berneri and Pablo Pérez, adapting Pérez's autobiographical novel of the same title.

The plot follows Pablo, a writer dealing with loneliness and AIDS. Yearning for love, he places ads in a gay magazine and finds himself involved in the secretive world of Buenos Aires gay leather scene.

A Year Without Love played the international and gay and lesbian film festival circuits, garnering a number of awards including the Teddy Bear prize for the Best Gay Film at the 2005 Berlin Film Festival.

Plot
Pablo is a struggling poet who is living with HIV in Buenos Aires. Over the course of a year he deals with issues relating to his health, his family, his search for love and his developing involvement with leather fetishism. The year culminates with the publication of his diary in the form of a novel, Un Año sin amor.

Cast
 Juan Minujín as Pablo Pérez
 Mimí Ardú as Pablo's aunt
 Carlos Echevarría as Nicolás
  as Julia
 Javier Van de Couter as Martín
 Osmar Núñez as Commissar Báez
 Ricardo Merkin as Pablo's father
  as the book editor
 Mónica Cabrera as social worker
 Ricardo Moriello as Juan
 Juan Carlos Ricci as Dr. Rizzo

Awards

Wins
 Berlin International Film Festival: Teddy Award, Best Feature Film; 2005.
 Outfest: Grand Jury Award, Outstanding International Narrative Feature; 2005.
 New York Lesbian and Gay Film Festival: Best Foreign Narrative Feature; 2005.

Nominations
 Mar del Plata Film Festival: FIPRESCI Prize, Anahi Berneri; Best film; 2005.
 Argentine Film Critics Association Awards: Silver Condor Award; Best Adapted Screenplay; Best New Actor, Juan Minujín; Best Costume Design, Roberta Pesci; 2006.

References

External links
 A Year Without Love at cinenacional.com .
 
 

2005 films
HIV/AIDS in film
Argentine biographical drama films
2005 biographical drama films
Argentine LGBT-related films
2000s Spanish-language films
Films shot in Buenos Aires
LGBT-related drama films
2005 drama films
2005 LGBT-related films
2000s Argentine films